Graham Jones (born 25 November 1973) is an Irish filmmaker.

He made his first feature film How to Cheat in the Leaving Certificate in 1997 which caused controversy when it was condemned by the Junior Minister for Education Willie O'Dea. It marked the beginning of a career in which Jones would explore many difficult subjects through independent movies including suicide, prostitution, homelessness, evolution, gender and the impact of the internet upon art.

Variety Magazine describes him as "a very talented director".  He wrote Irish Ghost, English Accent in 2010.

Filmography

References

External links

Graham Jones Official Website

Irish film directors
1973 births
Living people